HMCS Preserver was a depot ship of the Coastal Forces of the Royal Canadian Navy during World War II.  Commissioned in July 1942, Preserver supported Canadian Fairmile B motor launches in Canadian and Newfoundland waters during the war.

The ship was sold to the Peruvian Navy in 1946 and renamed the vessel Mariscal Castilla. Used as a fleet supply ship, Mariscal Castilla was renamed Cabo Blanco in 1953. Past 1960, the sources diverge on the fate of the vessel, with most stating that Cabo Blanco was broken up for scrap, while one states the vessel was sold into commercial service. Renamed Cayo Blanco and then Petronap the vessel caught fire and wrecked at San Lorenzo Island near Callao on 20 April 1963.

Description

The ship was either armed with one  naval gun and two  Oerlikon cannon or one  QF 12-pounder 12 cwt naval gun. The ship was designed to be a Fairmile B Motor Launch depot ship and was fitted with a machine shop, spare accommodations and extra fuel and store spaces. The vessel had a ship's company of 107, with 20 officers and 87 ratings.

Service history

Canadian service
The vessel was constructed at the Marine Industries shipyard at Sorel, Quebec in 1941 and given the yard number 104. Preserver was launched on 21 December 1941 and completed in July 1942, ahead of sister ship . The ship was commissioned on 11 July 1942 at Sorel and sailed for Halifax, Nova Scotia on 4 August, escorting a Quebec-Sydney convoy en route. The ship was then assigned to Newfoundland Force as a base ship for the Fairmile B Motor Launches operating there. The ship arrived at St. John's, Newfoundland on 18 September. During the period at St. John's, Preserver became a refuelling station for all naval vessels within harbour as the main refuelling tanks at St. John's had not finished construction. Preserver and a flotilla of Fairmiles were deployed to Botwood, Newfoundland. Botwood had been planned as a new Royal Canadian Navy base and Preserver and the Fairmiles were sent there to protect the transports unloading aviation fuel at Lewisporte that was destined for the airfield at Gander. Preserver and the Fairmiles returned to St. John's in mid-December 1942, sailing for Botwood again the following July. At the end of July 1943, Preserver and the Fairmiles relocated to Red Bay, returning to St. John's in November. Due to strategic changes in the Atlantic theatre, Botwood was abandoned as a base and Preserver and the Fairmiles became the only Royal Canadian Navy vessels ever to deploy there.

In mid-June 1944, Preserver and the Fairmiles returned to Red Bay. In September, they transferred to Sydney before Preserver sailed to Halifax for a refit. Upon returning to service, Preserver was sent to St. John's and then to Shelburne, Nova Scotia in June 1945. The ship was paid off on 6 November 1945 and sold to the Peruvian Navy on 4 January 1946.

Peruvian service and fate
The ship was re-designated a fleet supply ship and renamed Mariscal Castilla. The name commemorated the former president of Peru, Marshal Ramón Castilla. The ship was renamed Cabo Blanco in 1951 and continued in Peruvian service until March 1961. The sources diverge from here on the fate of the vessel. Macpherson & Barrie, Colledge & Warlow, and Blackman all state the vessel was broken up for scrap. The Miramar Ship Index states the vessel was sold into commercial service to Agencia Nacional de Vapores Jose Poblete Vidal in 1960 and renamed Cayo Blanco and registered in Panama. In 1962, the ship was sold again, this time to Aninat & Bluhn and renamed Petronap. On 20 April 1963, Petronap caught fire and wrecked on San Lorenzo Island near Callao, Peru.

Notes

Citations

Sources
 
 
 
 
 
 

Auxiliary ships of the Royal Canadian Navy
1941 ships
Auxiliary ships of the Peruvian Navy